Geiranger – From Fjord to Summit is a sporting event in the village of Geiranger in the municipality of Stranda in Møre og Romsdal county, Norway. The event was started in 1994 and consists of the Geiranger Half Marathon, the Dalsnibba Cycle Race, the Geiranger March, and the Dalsnibba Minithon. The annual event draws about 400-500 participants.

History

The best time for Geiranger Half Marathon is 1:26:42, which was set by Kílian Jornet Burgada in 2019. For women, Anita Håkenstad has the record with 1:46:19 set in 2006. For the Dalsnibba Cycle Race, Alf-Roger Holme has the record with 1:07:01 for men and Frid Harstad got 1:29:02 when she was the fastest woman ever. For racing bicycle, Lars Kristian Johnsen has the time 1:06:43 and for women, Hanne Trønnes finished with 1:34:34. All four bicycle records were achieved in 2006. 

The Geiranger Half Marathon was one of the first Fell running event in Norway when it started in 1994. In 2003, the Skåla Opp was started and is today the biggest in Norway.

References

External links
 Geiranger - From Fjord to Summit

Duathlon competitions
Stranda
Sports competitions in Norway